SuperPretzel is a brand of frozen pretzels marketed by J & J Snack Foods Corporation.  The basic product is a box containing 6 pretzels, which are designed to be heated in either the oven or microwave, as well as a packet of salt to add to the pretzels.

History
In 1971, Gerry Shreiber bought a struggling pretzel company in bankruptcy court for about $70,000. Shreiber's plan was to market soft pretzels to sports stadiums, which at the time had a limited menu. To build a display case, Shreiber used several metal hooks arranged in the shape of a tree, and built a glass case around it. He coined the name "SuperPretzel" due to his love of Superman.

Operations
SuperPretzel products are available across a number of retail chains in the United States and Canada including Target, K Mart, Winn Dixie, Key Food, and Food Universe. Their products are also sold online by Instacart, Amazon Fresh, Fresh Direct, PeaPod, goPuff, and Shipt.A

References

External links

 Product website
 Company website

J & J Snack Foods Corporation brands
Pretzels